When I Woke is the second album and major-label debut of the American rock band Rusted Root.  It has been certified Platinum in the United States.

Track listing
All songs written by Rusted Root with Lyrics by Michael Glabicki except where noted.

Personnel
Rusted Root
Mike Glabicki - lead vocal, acoustic guitar, electric guitar, 12-string guitar
Liz Berlin - backing vocals, percussion, acoustic guitar
Jim Donovan - drum set, percussion, backing vocals
Patrick Norman - bass, electric guitar, backing vocals, percussion
John Buynak - acoustic guitar, electric guitar, flute, penny whistle, harmonicas, banjo, marimba, backing vocals, percussion
Jenn Wertz - backing vocals, percussion
Daniel James "Jim" DiSpirito - congas, djembe, talking drum, myriad hand percussion

Charts

Weekly charts

Year-end charts

References

1994 albums
Rusted Root albums
Albums produced by Bill Bottrell
Mercury Records albums
PolyGram albums